Heath Miller (born 1982) is an American football player.

Heath Miller may also refer to:

 Heath Miller (actor) (born 1980), Australian actor
 Heath Miller (wrestler) (born 1983), American wrestler